The Swiss Broadcasting Corporation (SRG SSR) is the Swiss public broadcasting association, founded in 1931, the holding company of 26 radio and television channels. Headquartered in Bern, the Swiss Broadcasting Corporation is a non-profit organisation, funded mainly through radio and television licence fees (70%) and making the remaining income from advertising and sponsorship.

Switzerland's system of direct democracy and the fact that the country has four official languages (German, French, Italian and Romansh) mean that the structure of Swiss public service broadcasting is rather complicated. The actual holders of the broadcasting licences that enable SRG SSR to operate are four regional corporations:
 German Switzerland:  (SRF)
 French Switzerland:  (RTS)
 Italian Switzerland:  (RSI)
 Romansh:  (RTR)

These four corporations maintain SRG SSR as a joint central production and broadcasting association. The fifth business unit of the SRG SSR is the ten-language news platform Swissinfo.

Name

The corporate name, SRG SSR, is derived from its initials in German and its initials in French, Italian and Romansh. In English, the organisation is known as the Swiss Broadcasting Corporation. The moniker "", which refers to the public service mission of the organisation, was adopted in 1999 and was removed from the name in May 2011.

History

Europe's third public radio station started broadcasting from Lausanne in 1922, from the start based on a licence fee system. 980 licences were bought in 1923. Within a few years radio cooperatives working along the same principles had started throughout the country. In 1930 it was decided that radio was an important public service that should not be allowed to become a money maker for private interests, and that it needed to be structured on a federal basis. In 1931 SRG SSR was founded (see original names above), as a co-ordination organisation for the regional broadcast associations, and received the only licence to broadcast from the Federal Council. The same year it was agreed that all news reports in the new medium had to be provided by the Swiss news agency SDA, a decision that remained unchanged until 1971.

The first national transmitters began operating in 1931: Radio Sottens for French, Radio Beromünster for German, and 1933 Radio Monte Ceneri for Italian. In 1938 Romansh was recognised as the country's fourth national language, and the Zürich studios began broadcasting programmes in Romansh in between those in German. During the Second World War, SRG SSR filled an important function as a neutral, unbiased supplier of news, reaching far outside Switzerland's borders through shortwave transmissions. Radio Beromünster and Radio Monte Ceneri became known as the only free German and Italian-language radio stations in Europe.

In 1950 SRG SSR was one of 23 founding broadcasting organisations of the European Broadcasting Union. In 1939 television test transmissions started in Zürich. In 1953 regular TV transmissions started in German (from Zürich) – one hour per evening, five days a week – immediately attracting 920 early TV licence buyers. A year later, in 1954, French transmissions were broadcast from Geneva. For the Italian-speaking region, the programmes were re-transmitted with Italian subtitles until dedicated Italian studios were built in 1958. 50,000 TV licences were bought the first year.

In 1960 the company was renamed Schweizerische Radio- und Fernsehgesellschaft (and the equivalent names in the other languages - see above) to reflect the addition of television services. In 1964 the Federal Council allowed television advertising, as a means of keeping licence fees down. In 1966 the three main languages were each given a second radio channel, in order to counter the effects of new commercial broadcasters outside the country, whose strong signals were reaching the Swiss population. In the same year a dedicated Romansh broadcasting unit was created in Chur, using some of the new German-language second channel's broadcasting time. In 1968 colour television was introduced, and the number of licence fee payers passed one million.

In 1978 the radio channels started stereo transmissions. In 1983 the Federal Council relaxed the Swiss media legislation to permit local private and commercial radio channels. SRG SSR countered this threat by launching its third set of channels, aimed at a younger audience. In 1991 SRG SSR underwent a wide-ranging restructuring. The enterprise organised itself as a private industry association, structured as a holding company under Swiss company law. The name, SRG SSR idée suisse, was introduced in 1999. In 1992 Radio Rumantsch was separated from the German-language radio broadcaster, that had housed the Romansh broadcasting activities since 1938, and in 1994 the Romansh TV activities were moved over as well and the Romansh company renamed itself Radio e Televisiun Rumantscha.

In 1997, SRG SSR started digitally on Hot Bird (13 degrees East) satellite. It is encrypted from satellite due to copyright restrictions. SRG SSR Sat Access information channel stopped broadcasting in 2005. In 2016, all channels are broadcast over satellite only in HD quality. All radio and SRF info TV channels is free-to-air in satellite.

On 3 June 2019, SRG SSR terminated digital terrestrial (DVB-T) broadcasts of all of its television channels due to the extremely low usage of digital terrestrial signals on television sets in Switzerland, which was part of a series of cost-saving measures partly brought about as a result of the 2018 "No Billag" popular initiative. Since then, reception of SRG SSR television channels is only possible mainly through digital cable, Internet streaming, IPTV and DTH satellite.

Organisation
SRG SSR is headquartered in Bern. It is governed by a Board of Directors, appointed by a central council consisting of representatives of the four organisations.

Broadcasting is handled by five business units:
 Schweizer Radio und Fernsehen: handles German-speaking radio and television
 Radio télévision suisse: handles French-speaking radio and television
 Radiotelevisione svizzera di lingua italiana: handles Italian-speaking radio and television
 Radio Television Rumantscha: handles Romansh-speaking radio and television
 Swissinfo.ch: handles external services and the web portal swissinfo.ch

In addition, there are six subsidiary companies which produce TV programmes, teletext pages, book publishing, TV commercials, and audience research.

Until the termination of all terrestrial signals on 3 June 2019, the only television channels available in the whole of Switzerland were SRF 1, RTS Un, and RSI La 1, but the other channels are available in the linguistic regions represented by the broadcast language, and also nationally via cable, satellite and via the Internet. HD suisse was the first high-definition television channel of the SRG SSR. Programming came from the four language networks of SRG SSR.

SRG SSR is free to watch all television channels on the internet. However, it cannot be watched outside Switzerland due to broadcasting rights on all television channels. Only RTS Couleur 3 television channel it is watched over the internet outside of Switzerland. All radio broadcasts are listened to outside Switzerland.

Swissinfo

The former abbreviation SRI originally stood only for "Swiss Radio International", which was SRG SSR's international broadcasting arm (1935–2004), aimed at expatriates and others interested in Switzerland. In October 2004, SRI ceased broadcasting on shortwave and satellite, and instead concentrated its efforts on its multimedia internet platform swissinfo.ch, which now takes most of the resources. The Swissinfo website is produced in English, French, German, Italian, Spanish, Portuguese, Arabic, Chinese, Russian and Japanese.

Swiss Satellite Radio
Swiss Satellite Radio (SSatR) is a radio company owned by SRG SSR that includes three stations: Radio Swiss Pop (pop music); Radio Swiss Jazz (jazz, soul and blues) and Radio Swiss Classic (classical music) all without interruptions. These stations have been on air since 1 September 1998.

See also 
 Television in Switzerland

References

External links

 
 SRG Deutschschweiz (SRG.D) - the German parent organisation 
 SSR Suisse Romande (SSR.SR) - the French parent organisation 
 Società cooperativa per la radiotelevisione nella Svizzera italiana (CORSI) - the Italian parent organisation 
 SRG SSR Svizra Rumantscha (SRG.R) - the Romansh parent organisation 
 

 

Mass media in Bern
Radio in Switzerland
European Broadcasting Union members
Multilingual broadcasters
Publicly funded broadcasters
Mass media companies established in 1931
Radio stations established in 1931
Television channels and stations established in 1953
1931 establishments in Switzerland
Peabody Award winners